Claudia Maria Neuhauser (born 1962) is a mathematical biologist whose research concerns spatial ecology. She also investigates computational biology and bioinformatics.

Education and career
As a student, Neuhauser studied mathematics and physics. She graduated from Heidelberg University in 1988, and earned a Ph.D. in mathematics from Cornell University in 1990 with a dissertation on ergodic theory supervised by Rick Durrett.

She became a mathematics professor at the University of Minnesota in 1996, and moved to the Rochester campus of the same university in 2008 before returning to the Twin Cities campus in 2013. She has also held faculty positions at the University of Southern California, University of Wisconsin–Madison, and University of California, Davis

Before moving to the University of Minnesota Rochester in 2008, she was Professor and Head of the Ecology, Evolution and Behavior department at the Twin Cities campus. At the University of Minnesota Twin Cities, she works as the director of Research Computing. She was the university's Director of Graduate Studies for the Bioinformatics and Computational Biology graduate program from 2008 to 2017. She is also a member of the Biochemistry, Molecular Biology and Biophysics; Computer Science and Engineering; and Ecology, Evolution and Behavior departments at the university. At the University of Houston, she works as the Associate Vice President/Associate Vice Chancellor for Research and Technology Transfer.

She is the former vice chancellor for academic affairs at the University of Minnesota Rochester and directs the Institute of Informatics at the University of Minnesota Twin Cities. At the University of Minnesota, she is also a Distinguished McKnight University Professor, Howard Hughes Medical Institute Professor, and Morse-Alumni Distinguished Teaching Professor.

Contributions
Neuhauser is the author of a mathematics textbook aimed at biology students, Calculus for Biology and Medicine. It was first published in 2000. Its fourth edition came out January 12, 2018.

Selected publications 

 Neuhauser, C., & Krone, S. M. (1997). The genealogy of samples in models with selection. Genetics, 145(2), 519–534.
 Krone, S. M., & Neuhauser, C. (1997). Ancestral processes with selection. Theoretical Population Biology, 51(3), 210–237. https://doi.org/10.1006/tpbi.1997.1299
 Bolker, B. M., Pacala, S. W., & Neuhauser, C. (2003). Spatial dynamics in model plant communities: What do we really know? American Naturalist, 162(2), 135–148. https://doi.org/10.1086/376575
 Kerr, B., Neuhauser, C., Bohannan, B. J. M., & Dean, A. M. (2006). Local migration promotes competitive restraint in a host-pathogen 'tragedy of the commons'. Nature, 442(7098), 75–78. https://doi.org/10.1038/nature04864

Recognition
In 2011, Neuhauser was elected as a fellow of the American Association for the Advancement of Science. In 2012, she became one of the inaugural fellows of the American Mathematical Society.

References

1962 births
Living people
American women mathematicians
Theoretical biologists
20th-century American mathematicians
University of Southern California faculty
University of Wisconsin–Madison faculty
University of California, Davis faculty
University of Minnesota faculty
Fellows of the American Association for the Advancement of Science
Fellows of the American Mathematical Society
Textbook writers
Women textbook writers
Mathematical ecologists
20th-century women mathematicians
American women biologists
Computational biologists
21st-century scientists
21st-century biologists
21st-century women mathematicians
American Mathematical Society
Cornell University alumni
Heidelberg University alumni
Women ecologists
20th-century American women
21st-century American women